Ebony Leea Morrison (born 28 December 1994) is a Liberian hurdler residing in the United States. In the 2020 Summer Olympics she took part in the women's 100m hurdles.

Morrison was one of three competitors representing Liberia at the 2020 Olympics, along with sprinters Joseph Fahnbulleh and Emmanuel Matadi. She and Fahnbulleh carried the Liberian flag in the Parade of Nations in the opening ceremony. The team's outfits were designed by Liberian-American designer Telfar Clemens.

She attended Auburn University before transferring in 2014–2015 to the University of Miami where she studied film and media studies.

References

External links
World Athletics profile
Image of Morrison and fellow-flagbearer Joseph Fahnbulleh at Getty Images

1994 births
Living people
Olympic athletes of Liberia
Liberian female hurdlers
Auburn University alumni
University of Miami alumni
Athletes (track and field) at the 2020 Summer Olympics
Auburn Tigers women's track and field athletes
Miami Hurricanes women's track and field athletes